Campbell Kellaway (born 1 November 2002) is an Australian cricketer representing Victoria and the Melbourne Stars.

Kellaway represented Australia at the 2022 ICC Under-19 Cricket World Cup and made his List A debut against Queensland in the Marsh One-Day Cup in November 2022. He then made his first class debut against Tasmania in the Sheffield Shield. He also signed with the Melbourne Stars, and made his debut against the Hobart Hurricanes in BBL 12 in December.

In December 2022, Kellaway scored an unbeaten century for the Cricket Australia XI against a visiting South African side.

Kellaway is the nephew of AFL footballers Andrew and Duncan Kellaway.

References

External links

2002 births
Living people
Victoria cricketers
Melbourne Stars cricketers